Zoviyeh or Zoveyeh may refer to:
 Zoviyeh-ye Yek-e Olya
 Zoviyeh-ye Yek-e Sofla
 Zoviyeh-ye Do